When I Have Fears is the debut studio album by Irish post-punk band, The Murder Capital. The album was released on 16 August 2019 through Human Season Records.

Critical reception 

Upon its release, When I Have Fears received acclaim from contemporary music critics. On review aggregation websites Metacritic and AnyDecentMusic?, When I Have Fears has an average weighted rating of 82 out of 100 based on eight critic reviews. On review aggregation website Album of the Year, When I Have Fears has an average rating of 87 out of 100 based on 11 ratings.

Track listing

Charts

References

External links 
 

2019 debut albums
The Murder Capital albums
Albums produced by Flood (producer)